The 1914–15 Bucknell Bison men's basketball team represented Bucknell University during the 1914–15 NCAA men's basketball season. The head coach was George Cockill, coaching the Bison in his first season.The Bison's team captain was Joe Gidaniec.

Schedule

|-

References

Bucknell Bison men's basketball seasons
Bucknell
Bucknell
Bucknell